Cheiloneurus elegans is a parasitic wasp species in the genus Cheiloneurus.

Its EPPO code is CHEUEL.

References

External links 

Encyrtinae
Insects described in 1820